Johan Audel (born 12 December 1983) is a footballer who played as a winger. Born in France, he represented the Martinique national team internationally. He is the brother of French player Thierry Audel.

Career
Audel began his career in the youth academy of south coast club OGC Nice before moving to French rivals Lille for the 2004–05 season. He stayed with the team for his first season with the club, before moving on loan to FC Lorient the following season. Eight goals in 30 games followed before Audel returned to his parent club. In the summer of 2007, he joined Ligue 1 Valenciennes FC and instantly proved his worth with a hat-trick in his first game against Toulouse FC, making him a very popular player for the fans.

On 9 August 2010, Audel moved to VfB Stuttgart on a four-year contract.

He was loaned out to FC Nantes on 2 September 2013 until June 2014, after his contract with VfB Stuttgart was extended until June 2015. On 24 May 2014, Audel signed a contract with FC Nantes until June 2016 and moved permanently to Nantes.

Career statistics 
Score and result list Martinique's goal tally first, score column indicates score after Audel goal.

Honours 
Lille
UEFA Intertoto Cup: 2004

References

External links 
 
 
 
 Thierry Audel at Footballdatabase

1983 births
Living people
French people of Martiniquais descent
French footballers
Footballers from Nice
Martiniquais footballers
Association football wingers
Association football forwards
Martinique international footballers
2017 CONCACAF Gold Cup players
Ligue 1 players
Ligue 2 players
Bundesliga players
3. Liga players
OGC Nice players
Lille OSC players
FC Lorient players
Valenciennes FC players
VfB Stuttgart players
FC Nantes players
Beitar Jerusalem F.C. players
French expatriate footballers
Martiniquais expatriate footballers
Martiniquais expatriate sportspeople in Germany
French expatriate sportspeople in Germany
Expatriate footballers in Germany
Martiniquais expatriate sportspeople in Israel
French expatriate sportspeople in Israel
Expatriate footballers in Israel